Cotral SpA (In Italian:Compagnia Trasporti Lazio or Lazio Transport Company) is a limited company which runs suburban and inter-urban public transport services in the Lazio region of Italy.

Transport companies of Italy